The 1914 East Worcestershire by-election was held on 16 July 1914.  The by-election was held due to the resignation in order for the incumbent Conservative MP, Austen Chamberlain, to fight a by-election in Birmingham West.  It was won by unopposed the Conservative candidate Frederick Leverton Harris.

References

1914 elections in the United Kingdom
1914 in England
By-elections to the Parliament of the United Kingdom in Worcestershire constituencies
Unopposed by-elections to the Parliament of the United Kingdom (need citation)